Tibby Creek may refer to:

 Tibby Creek (Noxubee River tributary), a stream in Mississippi
 Tibby Creek (Yockanookany River tributary), a stream in Mississippi

See also
 Tibbee Creek